Pir Aghaj (also Romanized as Pīr Āghāj; also known as Pir-Agach, Pīr Āghājī, and Pīr Āghājī) is a village in Sanjabad-e Gharbi Rural District, in the Central District of Kowsar County, Ardabil Province, Iran. At the 2006 census, its population was 174, in 33 families.

References 

Tageo

Towns and villages in Kowsar County